Lesueur's hairy bat (Cistugo lesueuri) also known as Lesueur's wing-gland bat is a species of bat in the family Cistugidae. It is found in dry savanna, Mediterranean-type shrubby vegetation, and hot deserts in Lesotho and South Africa.

References

Mammals described in 1919
Cistugo
Taxonomy articles created by Polbot
Bats of Africa